Birlikköy is a village in the Silopi district of Şırnak Province in Turkey. The village is populated by Kurds of the Botikan tribe and had a population of 461 in 2021.

The hamlets of Eğrıkonak and Ovabaşı are attached to Birlikköy.

References 

Villages in Silopi District
Kurdish settlements in Şırnak Province